This is a list of Israeli football transfers for the 2021–22 Winter Transfer Window.

Ligat Ha'Al

Beitar Jerusalem

In:

Out:

Bnei Sakhnin

In:

Out:

F.C. Ashdod

In:

Out:

Hapoel Be'er Sheva

In:

Out:

Hapoel Hadera

In:

Out:

Hapoel Haifa

In:

Out:

Hapoel Jerusalem

In:

Out:

Hapoel Nof HaGalil

In:

Out:

Hapoel Tel Aviv

In:

Out:

Ironi Kiryat Shmona

In:

Out:

Maccabi Haifa

In:

Out:

Maccabi Netanya

In:

Out:

Maccabi Petah Tikva

In:

Out:

Maccabi Tel Aviv

In:

Out:

Ligat Lemuit

Beitar Tel Aviv Bat Yam

In:

Out:

Bnei Yehuda

In:

Out:

F.C. Kafr Qasim

In:

Out:

Hapoel Acre

In:

Out:

Hapoel Afula

In:

Out:

Hapoel Ashdod

In:

Out:

Hapoel Kfar Saba

In:

Out:

Hapoel Petah Tikva

In:

Out:

Hapoel Ra'anana

In:

Out:

Hapoel Ramat Gan

In:

Out:

Hapoel Ramat HaSharon

In:

Out:

Hapoel Rishon LeZion

In:

Out:

Hapoel Umm al-Fahm

In:

Out:

Maccabi Ahi Nazareth

In:

Out:

Maccabi Bnei Reineh

In:

Out:

Sektzia Nes Tziona

In:

Out:

References

2021-22
Israeli Premier League
Transfers